Esbu Kola Rural District is a rural district (dehestan) in the Central District of Babol County, Mazandaran Province, Iran. At the 2006 census, its population was 16,319, in 4,197 families. The rural district has 22 villages.

References 

Rural Districts of Mazandaran Province
Babol County